Vayakkara  is a village located in Payyanur Taluk of Kannur district in the Indian state of Kerala.

Demographics
As of 2011 Census, Vayakkara village had population of 18,687 where 8,986 are males and 9,701 are females. In Vayakkara, 10.6% of the population was under 6 years of age. Vayakkara had an average literacy of 94.45% higher than the state average of 94.00%: male literacy was 96.2% and female literacy was 92.8%.

Transportation
The national highway (NH 66) passes through Perumba junction.  Mangalore and Mumbai can be accessed on the northern side and Cochin and Thiruvananthapuram can be accessed on the southern side.  The road to the east connects to Mysore and Bangalore.   The nearest railway station is Kannur on Mangalore-Palakkad line. There are airports at Mangalore and Calicut.

Notable people
 
 
Kaumudi Teacher (1917-2009), Gandhian and Indian freedom activist

References

Villages near Payyanur